Carlo Scognamiglio (born 31 May 1983, in Seriate) is an Italian professional road bicycle racer who rode for UCI Professional Continental team  until the team's demise.

Palmares 

 2nd, National U23 Road Race Championship (2004)

External links 

1983 births
Living people
People from Seriate
Italian male cyclists
Cyclists from the Province of Bergamo